Kivimetsän Druidi was a Finnish metal band from Kouvola. 'Kivimetsän Druidi' is Finnish for "druid of the stone forest".

Band history
Their lyrics are based on the fantasy novel Joni Koskinen's writing. The novel tells a story from The Land of the Crystal Mountain and Stone Forest.
'KmD' originally started as a two-man project by the Koskinen brothers. Joni Koskinen's biggest influence has been Moonsorrow. Yet each band member has their own personal influences. 
After releasing numerous demos and EPs, Kivimetsän Druidi finally signed a record deal with Century Media in 2008. The debut album titled Shadowheart was released in October 2008. All the EPs and demos were self-released.

Members

Former members 

 Leeni-Maria Hovila - female vocals (2008-2017)
 Joni Koskinen - male vocals, lead guitar (2002-2017)
 Antti Koskinen - keyboards (2002-2017)
 Antti Rinkinen - guitar (2004-2017)
 Simo Lehtonen - bass guitar (2007-2017)
 Atte Marttinen - drums (2007-2017)

 Ville Ryöti - drums (2005–2007)
 Jani Rämä - drums (2004–2005) (became a technician for the band)
 Jouni Riihelä - bass (2004–2006)
 Annika Laaksonen - female vocals (2004–2006)
 Lukas Pearsall - synth (2004–2007)
 Jenni Onishko - female vocals (2006–2008)

Discography

Studio albums
 Shadowheart (2008)
 Betrayal, Justice, Revenge (2010)

EPs
 Mustan valtikan aika (2006)
 Taottu (2008)
 The Lost Captains (2016)

Demos
 Kristallivuoren maa (2003)
 Taival (2004)
 The New Chapter (2007)

External links
Official website
Official Myspace page
Profile

Finnish heavy metal musical groups
Kouvola
Musical groups established in 2002
Finnish folk metal musical groups
2002 establishments in Finland